Hatchet Lake, Nova Scotia may refer to:

 Hatchet Lake, Halifax, Nova Scotia, a community in the Halifax Regional Municipality at 
 Hatchet Lake, a lake at 
 Hatchet Lake, a lake at 
 Hatchet Lake Pughole, a lake at